237–239 Main Street is a historic commercial building located at the address of the same name in Barnstable, Massachusetts.

Description and history 
It is a two-story, wood-framed, Queen Anne style retail block which has retained even its original storefronts. It has a narrow cornice with plain brackets, and some second-floor windows are paired and headed by triangular pediments. It is notable for the survival without significant alterations, of even its storefronts, since its construction in 1910, and is one of a small number of surviving commercial buildings form that period in Hyannis.

The building was listed on the National Register of Historic Places on March 13, 1987.

See also
National Register of Historic Places listings in Barnstable County, Massachusetts

References

Commercial buildings on the National Register of Historic Places in Massachusetts
Buildings and structures in Barnstable, Massachusetts
National Register of Historic Places in Barnstable, Massachusetts
Commercial buildings completed in 1910

Queen Anne architecture in Massachusetts